Robert Fendler (born 26 February 1921, date of death unknown) was an Austrian footballer. He competed in the men's tournament at the 1952 Summer Olympics.

References

External links
 
 

1921 births
Year of death missing
Austrian footballers
Austria international footballers
Olympic footballers of Austria
Footballers at the 1952 Summer Olympics
Sportspeople from Wiener Neustadt
Footballers from Lower Austria
Association football midfielders